Bertram Pitt Palmer (14 November 1901 – 4 September 1932) was a New Zealand rugby union player. A hooker and prop, Palmer represented  at a provincial level, and was a member of the New Zealand national side, the All Blacks, from 1928 to 1932. He played 18 matches for the All Blacks including three internationals. He died on 4 September 1932, a day after suffering a broken neck in an Auckland club rugby match.

References

1901 births
1932 deaths
Rugby union players from Whanganui
New Zealand rugby union players
New Zealand international rugby union players
Auckland rugby union players
Rugby union hookers
Rugby union props
Sport deaths in New Zealand